We'll All Be Burnt in Our Beds Some Night is a novel by Canadian writer Joel Thomas Hynes, published in 2017 by Harper Perennial. It won the Governor General's Award for English-language fiction at the 2017 Governor General's Awards and the Winterset Award,  and was longlisted for the 2017 Scotiabank Giller Prize.

The novel centres on Johnny Keough, who is undertaking a road trip from his home in Newfoundland to British Columbia to scatter the ashes of his girlfriend Madonna after she is killed in an accident.

References

2017 Canadian novels
Governor General's Award-winning fiction books
Novels by Joel Thomas Hynes
Novels about death
HarperCollins books